The inaugural NASCAR Budweiser Late Model Sportsman Series began on Saturday, February 13 and ended on Saturday, October 31. Jack Ingram, driving as an owner-driver, won the championship at season's end.

Teams and drivers

Schedule
Schedule as follows:

Races

Goody's 300

The Goody's 300, which had been a Sportsman race, was moved to the national tour, and was run on February 13 at Daytona International Speedway in Daytona Beach, Florida. Mike Porter won the pole.

Top ten results

15- Dale Earnhardt
98- Jody Ridley
00- Sam Ard
75- Gary Balough
99- Geoff Bodine
77- Harry Gant
3- Mike Porter
28- Phil Parsons
27- Tommy Houston
24- Dale Jarrett

Eastern 150 

The Eastern 150 was run on February 20 at Richmond Fairgrounds Raceway in Richmond, Virginia. Geoff Bodine won the pole.

Top ten results

6- Tommy Houston
 Bubba Nissen
22- Rick Mast
 Bosco Lowe
3- Mike Porter
24- Dale Jarrett
 Dickie Boswell
 Ray Hendrick
28- Phil Parsons
 Orvil Reedy

Southeastern 150 

The Southeastern 150 was run on March 13 at Bristol International Speedway in Bristol, Tennessee. David Pearson won the pole.

Top ten results

28- Phil Parsons
21- David Pearson
36- Tommy Ellis
11- Jack Ingram
15- Brad Teague
23- Larry Utsman
12- Ronnie Silver
2- Tommy Hilbert
35- Buck Doran
27- Willie Blevins

Dogwood 500 

The Dogwood 500 was run on March 28 at Martinsville Speedway in Martinsville, Virginia. Geoff Bodine won the pole.

Top ten results

00- Sam Ard
01- Butch Lindley
11- Jack Ingram
99- Geoff Bodine
29- Joe Thurman
 Jeff Hensley
 Jimmy Hensley
 Dickie Boswell
27- Tommy Houston
1- Pete Silva

TranSouth 200 

The TranSouth 200 was run on April 3 at Darlington Raceway in Darlington, South Carolina. Harry Gant won the pole.

Top ten results

99- Geoff Bodine
98- Jody Ridley
21- David Pearson
11- Jack Ingram
3- Mike Porter
00- Sam Ard
 Glenn Jarrett
50- John Anderson
27- Tommy Houston
 Allan Powell

Mountain Dew 300 

The Mountain Dew 300 was run on April 3 at Hickory Speedway in Hickory, North Carolina. Sam Ard won the pole.

Top ten results

11- Jack Ingram
00- Sam Ard
28- Phil Parsons
27- Tommy Houston
99- Geoff Bodine
 Gary Neice
14- Ronnie Silver
24- Dale Jarrett
 Ben Hess
 Allan Powell

Busch 200 

The Busch 200 was run on April 18 at South Boston Speedway in South Boston, Virginia. Jack Ingram won the pole.

Top ten results

00- Sam Ard
11- Jack Ingram
 Jimmy Hensley
 Ray Hendrick
 Bob Shreeves
27- Tommy Houston
 Bubba Nissen
 Wayne Patterson
 Dickie Boswell
 Gary Neice

Budweiser 200 

The Budweiser 200 was run on April 23 at Caraway Speedway in Asheboro, North Carolina. Sam Ard won the pole.

Top ten results

15- Dale Earnhardt
 Jimmy Hensley
00- Sam Ard
27- Tommy Houston
 Bob Shreeves
 Jeff Hensley
24- Dale Jarrett
 Darrell Wheeler
 Don Browning
 Butch Isom

Spring 220 

The Spring 220 was run on May 2 at Richmond Fairgrounds Raceway in Richmond, Virginia. Sam Ard won the pole.

Top ten results

01- Butch Lindley
00- Sam Ard
12- Tommy Ellis
11- Jack Ingram
 Ray Hendrick
28- Phil Parsons
 Jimmy Lawson
 Wayne Patterson
 Bubba Nissen
 Frank Butler

Hampton Chevy 200 

The Hampton Chevy 200 was run on May 8 at Langley Speedway in Hampton, Virginia. Bob Shreeves won the pole.

Top ten results

11- Jack Ingram
00- Sam Ard
28- Phil Parsons
 Ray Hendrick
1- Pete Silva
 Bob Shreeves
 Jimmy Lawson
 Diane Teel
 Jeff Hensley
 Lester Gupton

Sportsman 200 

The Sportsman 200 was run on May 15 at Dover Downs International Speedway in Dover, DE. Harry Gant won the pole.

Top ten results

75- Joe Ruttman
11- Jack Ingram
01- Butch Lindley
12- Tommy Ellis
21- David Pearson
6- Tommy Houston
28- Phil Parsons
99- Geoff Bodine
25- Bobby Allison
33- George Dalton

Sunkist 200 

The Sunkist 200 was run on May 23 at Hickory Speedway in Hickory, North Carolina. Morgan Shepherd won the pole.

Top ten results

7- Morgan Shepherd
00- Sam Ard
11- Jack Ingram
39- John Settlemyre
27- Tommy Houston
14- Ronnie Silver
 Bob Shreeves
 Gary Neice
24- Dale Jarrett
12- Tommy Ellis

Mello Yello 300 

The Mello Yello 300 was run on May 29 at Charlotte Motor Speedway in Concord, North Carolina. Harry Gant won the pole.

Top ten results

77- Harry Gant
15- Dale Earnhardt
7- Morgan Shepherd
12- Tommy Ellis
25- Bobby Allison
47- Darrell Waltrip
3- Mike Porter
99- Geoff Bodine
22- David Rogers
24- Glenn Jarrett

Inaugural 200 

The Inaugural 200 was run on June 11 at New Asheville Speedway in Asheville, North Carolina. Gary Neice won the pole.

Top ten results

11- Jack Ingram
12- Tommy Ellis
00- Sam Ard
14- Ronnie Silver
7- Morgan Shepherd
 Bosco Lowe
28- Phil Parsons
 Ronnie Davidson
 Richie Rice
24- Dale Jarrett

Winston 200 

The Winston 200 was run on June 19 at Hickory Speedway in Hickory, North Carolina. Tommy Ellis won the pole.

Top ten results

39- John Settlemyre
12- Tommy Ellis
00- Sam Ard
11- Jack Ingram
14- Ronnie Silver
24- Dale Jarrett
27- Tommy Houston
1- Pete Silva
28- Phil Parsons
 Ronnie Davidson

Roses Stores 200 

The Roses Stores 200 was run on June 26 at South Boston Speedway in South Boston, VA. Butch Lindley won the pole.

Top ten results

01- Butch Lindley
00- Sam Ard
28- Phil Parsons
11- Jack Ingram
22- Rick Mast
 Bob Shreeves
24- Dale Jarrett
 Dickie Boswell
 Carol Harris
 Bob Glass

Coca-Cola 200 

The Coca-Cola 200 was run on June 27 at North Carolina Motor Speedway in Rockingham, NC. This race was originally scheduled for March, but was snowed out. David Pearson won the pole.

Top ten results

21- David Pearson
15- Dale Earnhardt
28- Phil Parsons
11- Jack Ingram
00- Sam Ard
1- Pete Silva
 Satch Worley
24- Dale Jarrett
 Harry Lee Hill
 Steve Jarvis

Goody's 200 

The Goody's 200 was run on July 7 at Caraway Speedway in Asheville, North Carolina. Sam Ard won the pole.

Top ten results

11- Jack Ingram
00- Sam Ard
7- Morgan Shepherd
 Jimmy Hensley
1- Pete Silva
24- Dale Jarrett
27- Tommy Ellis
 John Utsman
 Jeff Hensley
 Jimmy Lawson

Lowes 200 

The Lowes 200 was run on July 24 at South Boston Speedway in South Boston, VA. Butch Lindley won the pole.

Top ten results

00- Sam Ard
11- Jack Ingram
12- Tommy Ellis
01- Butch Lindley
27- Tommy Houston
 Bubba Nissen
 Jimmy Hensley
 Carol Harris
24- Dale Jarrett
 Charlie Luck

Goody's 200 

The Goody's 200 was run on August 1 at Hickory Speedway in Hickory, North Carolina. Tommy Ellis won the pole.

Top ten results

27- Tommy Houston
12- Tommy Ellis
11- Jack Ingram
1- Pete Silva
00- Sam Ard
 Allan Powell
 Gary Neice
28- Phil Parsons
 Ronnie Davidson
 Bennie Davis

Gene Lovelace 200 

The Gene Lovelace 200 was run on August 7 at Langley Speedway in Hampton, VA. Tommy Ellis won the pole.

Top ten results

12- Tommy Ellis
11- Jack Ingram
00- Sam Ard
27- Tommy Houston
1- Pete Silva
28- Phil Parsons
 Carol Harris
 Charlie Luck
24- Dale Jarrett
 Jimmy Lawson

Kroger 200 

The Kroger 200 was run on August 13 at Indianapolis Raceway Park in Clermont, IN. Sam Ard won the pole.

Top ten results

7- Morgan Shepherd
12- Tommy Ellis
27- Tommy Houston
 Jimmy Hensley
11- Jack Ingram
01- Butch Lindley
 Rick Mast
 Randy Tissot
25- Bobby Allison
 Jeff Berry

Pet Dairy 150 

The Pet Dairy 150 was run on August 27 at Bristol International Speedway in Bristol, Tennessee. Morgan Shepherd won the pole.

Top ten results

11- Jack Ingram
01- Butch Lindley
7- Morgan Shepherd
12- Tommy Ellis
27- Bosco Lowe
47- Randy Tissot
24- Glenn Jarrett
21- Larry Pearson
00- Sam Ard
6- Tommy Houston

Bobby Isaac Memorial 200 

The Bobby Isaac Memorial 200 was run on September 4 at Hickory Speedway in Hickory, North Carolina. Sam Ard won the pole.

Top ten results

11- Jack Ingram
00- Sam Ard
27- Tommy Houston
7- Morgan Shepherd
 Gary Neice
39- John Settlemyre
12- Tommy Ellis
24- Dale Jarrett
28- Phil Parsons
14- Ronnie Silver

Harvest 150 

The Harvest 150 was run on September 11 at Richmond Fairgrounds Raceway in Richmond, VA. Tommy Ellis won the pole.

Top ten results

01- Butch Lindley
7- Morgan Shepherd
00- Sam Ard
27- Tommy Houston
 Bob Shreeves
11- Jack Ingram
 Charlie Luck
22- Rick Mast
 Bubba Nissen
 Jimmy Lawson

Autumn 150 

The Autumn 150 was run on September 25 at Martinsville Speedway in Martinsville, VA. Sam Ard won the pole.

Top ten results

00- Sam Ard
1- Butch Lindley
6- Tommy Houston
12- Tommy Ellis
11- Jack Ingram
28- Phil Parsons
5- Joe Thurman
99- Wayne Patterson
4- Carol Harris
39- John Settlemyre

Miller Time 300 

The Miller Time 300 was run on October 9 at Charlotte Motor Speedway in Concord, NC. Phil Parsons won the pole.

Top ten results

17- Darrell Waltrip
00- Sam Ard
88- Bobby Allison
24- Glenn Jarrett
11- Jack Ingram
5- John Anderson
28- Phil Parsons
21- Larry Pearson
4- Rodney Combs
24- Bosco Lowe

Southern Auto Racing News 200 

The Southern Auto Racing News 200 was run on October 17 at Hickory Speedway in Hickory, NC. Phil Parsons won the pole.

Top ten results

11- Jack Ingram
12- Tommy Ellis
24- Dale Jarrett
1- Pete Silva
 Bob Shreeves
 Billy Hess
 Wayne Patterson
 Allan Powell
28- Phil Parsons
 Jimmy Hensley

Cardinal 250 

The Cardinal 250 was run on October 31 at Martinsville Speedway in Martinsville, VA. Tommy Ellis won the pole.

Top ten results

01- Butch Lindley
 Charlie Luck
 Bob Shreeves
3- Mike Porter
 Bob Pressley
00- Sam Ard
28- Phil Parsons
 Jeff Hensley
14- Ronnie Silver
 Paul Radford

The above information is from Racing Reference.

Final Points Standings 

Jack Ingram - 4495 
Sam Ard - 4448
Tommy Ellis - 3873
Tommy Houston -  3827
Phil Parsons - 3783
Dale Jarrett - 3415
Pete Silva - 2349
Jimmy Lawson - 2105
Butch Lindley - 2063
Bob Shreeves - 1928

See also
1982 NASCAR Winston Cup Series

References

External links 
NASCAR Budweiser Late Model Sportsman Series Standings and Statistics for 1982

NASCAR Xfinity Series seasons